The Ray River is a river of Vietnam. It flows north-south for  through Đồng Nai Province and Bà Rịa–Vũng Tàu province.

References

Rivers of Bà Rịa-Vũng Tàu province
Rivers of Đồng Nai province
Rivers of Vietnam